Felipe Micael Tenorio Menezes (born 3 July 2001) is a Brazilian footballer who plays as a forward for Athletic.

Career statistics

Club

Notes

References

2001 births
People from Catanduva
Footballers from São Paulo (state)
Living people
Brazilian footballers
Association football forwards
Mirassol Futebol Clube players
K Beerschot VA players
Ceará Sporting Club players
FC Cascavel players
Campeonato Brasileiro Série D players
Brazilian expatriate footballers
Brazilian expatriate sportspeople in Belgium
Expatriate footballers in Belgium
Brazilian expatriate sportspeople in the United Arab Emirates
Expatriate footballers in the United Arab Emirates